Steve Wicks (born 3 October 1956) is an English former professional footballer who played as a centre-half, most notably played for Chelsea, Derby County and Queens Park Rangers in the 1970s and 1980s. Wicks made his debut for Chelsea aged 19 in 1975. After initially leaving QPR for Crystal Palace in 1981 he returned to QPR in March 1982, but was cup-tied for their appearance in the 1982 FA Cup Final.

Over his two spells at QPR he was part of the successful side that won the Second Division Championship in 1983 and appeared in the League Cup Final in 1986.

He later moved into management with Crawley Town, and in the Football League at that time with Scarborough, and then Lincoln City where he held the post for only 42 days. He then moved abroad and managed in Singapore with Woodlands Wellington and subsequently Malaysian side Selangor FA from 1997 to 1998. He is currently working at Queens Park Rangers football club as part of the corporate hospitality team. He is the father of Matt Wicks who was on the books at Manchester United and Arsenal and played for Brighton and Hove Albion. After retiring from football Wicks got offered a managing job in Malaysia and Singapore, which he took, and all his family moved with him. He enjoyed the time away but returned to England five years later.

References

External links

1956 births
Living people
Sportspeople from Reading, Berkshire
English footballers
Footballers from Berkshire
Association football central defenders
England under-21 international footballers
Chelsea F.C. players
Derby County F.C. players
Queens Park Rangers F.C. players
Crystal Palace F.C. players
English Football League players
English football managers
Scarborough F.C. managers
Lincoln City F.C. managers
Woodlands Wellington FC head coaches
Singapore Premier League head coaches
Barnet F.C. non-playing staff
English expatriate football managers
English expatriate sportspeople in Malaysia
Expatriate football managers in Malaysia
English expatriate sportspeople in Singapore
Expatriate football managers in Singapore